Christopher Uchefuna Okeke (April 30, 1933 – January 5, 2016), also known as Uche Okeke, was an illustrator, painter, sculptor, and teacher. He was an art and aesthetic theorist, seminal to Nigerian modernism.

Background 
Christopher Uchefuna Okeke was born on 30 April 1933 in Nimo, Njikoka Local Government Area of Anambra State, Nigeria, to Isaac Okonkwo Okeke and Monica Mgboye Okeke (née Okoye). Between 1940 and 1953, he attended St. Peter Claver's (Primary) School, Kafanchan, Metropolitan College, Onitsha, and Bishop Shanahan College, Orlu, Nigeria, during which time he had already begun to demonstrate an avid interest in drawing and painting. Before being admitted to read Fine Art at Nigerian College of Arts, Science and Technology (NCAST), now Ahmadu Bello University, Zaria, Okeke had already exhibited taxidermy work during the Field Society meeting in Jos Museum, participated in the preparation and presentation of Nigerian Drawings and Paintings with Bernard Fagg as curator and had a solo exhibition of drawings and paintings, in Jos and Kaduna with Sir Ahmadu Bello in attendance.

Zaria Art Society 
As a young artist, Okeke was a founding member of the Zaria Art Society in 1958. The group was a result of political conflict in Nigeria struggling to gain independence and was founded by important protagonists of modernism in Nigerian Art like Yusuf Grillo, Bruce Onobrakpeya, Oseloka Osadebe, Demas Nwoko and others. Most of his professors at the Nigerian College were British and taught western style techniques however, The Zaria Society opposed the imposition of European art school ideas on young artists in Africa. In school, Okeke studied the Igbo, Yoruba, and Hausa ethnic groups, looking for a way to express his Nigerian self. Ancient Nigerian symbols are most commonly found on pottery or in body paintings. Igbo designs are called Uli Patterns.

Nsukka 

In 1971 Uche Okoke joined the Departement of Fine und Applied Arts at the University of Nigeria in Nsukka as a Professor and teacher. Together with colleagues and students he developed a unique style which became characteristic for the so called Nsukka School. With Chike Aniakor and Obiora Udechukwu he established the formation of art and aesthetics of Nigerian modernism in the seventies.

Igbo Culture and Design 

Okeke was first exposed to Igbo folktales as a child and later used them as inspiration in his art. In some of his drawings, the artist rendered the heroic mythological figures to bring attention to his Igbo heritage.

The Igbo culture area is east of the Niger River, west of the Cross River, and West of the Great Niger waterway of southeastern Nigeria. Throughout this area there is evidence of an ancient artistic culture. The traditional Igbo art form is called Uli Drawing. According to Okeke, Uli is an attempt to enhance the beauty of the human body. Traditionally, a Uli artist is a female person in Igbo society who paints patterns on the body and sometimes on the walls of sacred places. This process is called Ide Uli or Ise Uli. The motifs and symbols in Uli usually remain consistent however, it is the ordering of the design elements that challenge the ingenuity of traditional Igbo artists.

Many of the design elements in Uli are derived from nature. Striped and spotted beings like pythons and jaguars are examples of the sources the patterns come from. Uli patterns have geometric, plant, and animal motifs. Additionally, the color choices the artist makes have significance. Okeke explains how colors are used and where they come from. The medium in Uli Drawings are extracted from the pods of plants. Uli Oba, Uli Nkilisi, and Uli Ede Eji are names of the plants from which the medium is extracted.

Art in ‘Igboland’ is attributed to the earth goddess Ala. Art springs from mother nature and is seen as a means of fostering the spiritual and physical well being of kindred communities. It represents the life of the people and the bare bones of creativity. Uli also has certain lyrical qualities which have inspired songs in Igbo folklore.

Art and aesthetic 

Uche Okokes artistic productivity was backed by several aesthetic considerations coming along with his artistic projects. His early writings seize on the ideas of Pan-Africanism and Négritude. Among others it was the compelling style of his essays that earned the group of young students at the Ahmadu Bello University the title "Zaria rebels". In his later reflections he focused on the political role artists should cultivate.

University Administrator and The Asele Institute 

He also opened a cultural centre at 30 Ibadan Street, Kafanchan, which later became the Asele Institute, Nimo, where among other cultural activities a part of the Smithsonian Institution-sponsored educational film Nigerian Art - Kindred Spirits was shot in 1996. The institute contains a collection of artifacts, objects, and artwork from friends Okeke acquired during his travels to different parts of Nigeria. It remains one of the most important repositories of documents, artifacts, and mid-20th century African art.

Uche was appointed lecturer and acting head of Fine Arts Department at the University of Nigeria, Nsukka, from 1971 to 1985. He transformed their curriculum to have more of a focus on African indigenous art and design which he believed would benefit the development of modern and contemporary African Art. In 1973, he also redesigned the curriculum of the Department of Fine and Applied Arts, Institute of Management and Technology, Enugu, and initiated postgraduate courses in the Department of Fine Arts, University of Nigeria, Nsukka.

He was the Director of the Institute of African Studies at the University of Nigeria in Nsukka, a visiting Professor to the Department of Creative Arts, University of Port Harcourt, Honorary Deputy Director-General (Africa) of International Biographical Centre, Cambridge, among numerous other engagements with many educational and cultural institutions.

That Okeke carried the Uli experiment beyond the walls of Zaria and stood in the forefront of its transformation into a modern idiom in the 1970s, from the studios at Nsukka was original. He is a leading figure in the history of modern African Art.

Okeke died on 5 January 2016 in his native home at Nimo at the age of 82.

Professional career

In 1958 he became the founder and Director of Asele Institute and Documentation Center, Nimo, Nigeria.

1986–2006	Visiting professor and external examiner, University of Port Harcourt, Rivers State, 
	Ahmadu Bello University, Zaria. Obafemi Awolowo University (formerly University of Ife).

Federal Polytechnic, Oko. Imo State University, Owerri, Nigeria.

1970–85	University of Nigeria, Nsukka, Nigeria.
		Positions held;
		Acting Head of Department, Fine and Applied Arts Department
		Dean Faculty of Arts
		Director, Institute of African Studies.

1981–82	Honorary Fellow, Department of Textile and Clothing Design, and Art History, University of Minnesota, USA (one-year sabbatical leave).

1968	Refugee Affairs Committee, Aba, Nigeria.

1964–67	Director, Mbari Art Centre, Uwani, Enugu, Nigeria.

1964–66	Artistic Director and Designer, Enugu Musical Society, Enugu, Nigeria.

1961–62	Freelance artist and Director, Cultural Centre, Kafanchan, Nigeria.

1961	Publications Artist, Federal Ministry of Information, Lagos.

1959	Founder/Director, Cultural Centre Kafanchan (now Asele Institute Nimo),	Nigeria.

1958-61	Founder/First Secretary/Second President, Art Society, Nigerian College of Arts Science and Technology, Zaria, Nigeria.

1955–57	Clerk, Department of Labour, Jos and Lagos, Nigeria.

1956	Organising Assistant, Exhibition of Nigerian Painting and Drawing, Jos Museum, Jos, Nigeria.

1954–55	Designer, visual aids, St. Peter Claver's Catholic and College of Mary Immaculate Heart
	Practicing Schools, Kafanchan, Nigeria.

Practice

Solo exhibitions
2006		Another Modernity: Works on Paper by Uche Okeke, Newark Museum, Newark, New Jersey, USA.
2003		Retrospective solo exhibition, Pendulum Gallery, Lagos, Nigeria
1982		Contemporary Nigerian Prints, Drawings and Paintings: Uche Okeke. Katherine E. Nash Gallery, University of Minneapolis, Twin Cities, Minnesota, USA.
		Homage to Asele, Exhibition of Prints, Drawings and Paintings: Uche Okeke, African American Cultural Centre, Minneapolis, Minnesota, USA.
1979		Retrospective Exhibition of Drawings and Prints, German Cultural Centre, Lagos, Nigeria.
1978		Graphik Aus Nigeria, Germany.
1963	Exhibition of Mosaics and stained glass window, Franz Mayer and Company, Munich, Germany.
1962	Exhibition of drawings, Rott am Inn, Germany.

Group exhibitions
2010		Nigerian 50th Independence Exhibition, Abuja, Nigeria.
		Afro Modern: Journeys through the Black Atlantic, Tate Modern, Liverpool.
NIVATOUR, Group Exhibition by the National Gallery of Art, Abuja, Alexandria and Cairo, Egypt.
2009		Society of Nigerian Artists Anniversary Exhibition, Omenka Gallery, Lagos, Nigeria.
		Group Exhibition in honour of Chinua Achebe and the 50th anniversary of Things Fall Apart.
2008		ARESUVA, National Gallery of Art, Abuja, Nigeria.
2006		Another Modernity: Works on paper by Uche Okeke, Newark Museum, Newark, New Jersey, USA.
2002	Poetics of Line: Seven Artists of the Nsukka Group, National Museum of African Art,	Smithsonian Institution, Washington, DC, USA.
1995	Seven Stories about Modern Art in Africa, Whitechapel Art Gallery, London.
1977	Exhibition of African Contemporary Art, Howard University, Department of Art, College of Fine Arts, Washington D.C. USA.
		Exhibition of Nigerian Contemporary Art (FESTAC), National Council for Arts and Culture, Lagos.
1976	Joint Exhibition of prints and textiles, Department of Human Environment and Design/African Studies Centre, Kresge Gallery, Michigan State University, East Lansing, Michigan USA.
1974	African Prints, an Exhibition of Contemporary African Art, Kresge Art Gallery, Michigan State University, East Lansing, Michigan, USA.
1972	Group Exhibition, Nasprstek Museum, Prague, Czechoslovakia.
1969	Kunst aus Biafra, Cologne, Düsseldorf, Bonn, Trier, Dortmund, Essen and Munich,	Germany.
1966	World Festival of Negro Arts Exhibition, Dakar, Senegal
1967	Drei Kreuzwege – Drei Kontinente, with Hansen-Bahia (Germany) and Vivial Ellis (USA), Munich, Germany.
1964	Group Exhibition, Harmon Foundation Inc., New York, USA.
1963/64	Three-man show with Ibrahim el-Salahi (Sudan) and Valente Malagantana (Mozambique), Committee for Cultural Freedom, India and Pakistan.
1962	Group Exhibition, Rhodes National Gallery, Salisbury, Rhodesia.
Gallery Lambert, Paris, France.
	Ugandan Independence Art Exhibition, Kampala.

Commissioned work
2015    OIS Services passport and Visa Centre, Johannesburg, South Africa.
1989	Oko Cross, St. John's Anglican Church, Oko, Anambra State.
	Portraits of Father Iwene Tansi, commissioned by the Holy Trinity Cathedral, Onitsha, Anambra State	
1976	Park and fountain designs for the Open Spaces Development Commission, Anambra State.
1975	Fourteen Stations of the Cross, St Peter's Catholic Church chapel, University of Nigeria Nsukka.
1971–74	Designed Archbishop's Throne and portals, Holy Trinity Cathedral, Onitsha, Anambra State.
1971	Designed and produced carved wooden doors for Holy Trinity Cathedral, Onitsha, Anambra State.
1967	Stage design for television serial, Heritage, ENTV production.
1966	EDI Sculpture, Enugu Campus, University of Nigeria, Nsukka.
	Film titles design, Eastern Nigeria Information Service's Film Division, Enugu, Nigeria.
Sketch designs for the wrought-metal screen wall, Anglican Church chapel, University of Nigeria, Nsukka.
Designed robes for the Presbyterian Church Choir, Uwani, Enugu.
1965	Illustrated Chinua Achebe's Things Fall Apart
	Designed book jacket and cover for John Munonye's The Only Son
1964	Designed Boys Scouts of Nigeria Badges
	Designed Oil Murals and Paintings for the Eastern Nigeria Central Library, Children's Section. Theme: Animals in Procession.
1962–63	Three murals in mosaic and stained glass for Franz Meyer and Company, Munich, Germany.
1961	Mural for the Mbari Artists and Writers Club House and Gallery, Ibadan, Nigeria.
1960	Mother Nigeria and Her Children, mural for Independence Exhibition, Victoria Island, Lagos, Nigeria.

Awards
2009	Federal Government Award for distinguished service in the Arts and Culture Sector.
2001	Presidential award of MFR by the President of the Federal Republic of Nigeria.
1977	Prize for Terra Cotta Sculpture titled Dance of Unity, Murtala Mohammed International Sculpture competition, Lagos.
1973	British Council Bursary Award
1972	Illustrator of the Year 1972, for Tales of Land of Death, Igbo Folk Tales, published by Doubleday, New York, awarded by National UNESCO Commission's Book of the Year competition.
1971	Drama award by the African Studies Centre, University of California, USA.
1962–63	Fellowship award to study mosaic and stained-glass window techniques awarded by the West German government.
1960	Poetry prize in a national literary competition organized by the National Arts Council.
1959	First place Esso Inc., Nigerian Independence calendar design competition, Lagos.
1958–61 Nigerian Federal Government Scholarship
1957	Out-of-doors painting award by the Head of Department of Fine Art, NCAST, Zaria.

Honors, distinctions, and memberships
1987 Member, Adjudication Panel, Biennale of Children's Book Illustration, Bratislava, Czechoslovakia.
1985 Member, Nigerian Delegation to UNESCO General Conference, Sophia, Bulgaria
1984 Delegate, International Artists’ Congress, Helsinki, Finland.
1983 Member, Nigerian Delegation to UNESCO General Conference, Paris, France.
1981 UNESCO Delegate to the 24th General Conference, Belgrade, Yugoslavia.
1979 Children's Books on Africa and their Authors, an annotated bibliography – Nancy J. Schmidt. New York and London: Africana Publishing Company.
1978 Member of Editorial Board, Black Orpheus, University of Lagos.
1978 Chairman of the Cultural Sector, UNESCO Commission, Lagos.
1977 Africa Yearbook and Who's Who *1977, London, Africa Journal Ltd.
1977 International Directory of Scholars and Specialists in African Studies, 1st edition, Waltham, Massachusetts, USA: Brandels University African Studies Association.
1976–77 Member, Visual Arts Committee, FESTAC '77, Lagos.
1976–77 Member of International Association of Artists (IIA), Paris, France.
1976–77 Vice-President Society for Nigerian Artists.
1976 Associate member, the Nigerian Art Education Association (NAEA), Reston, Virginia, USA.
1976 Member of Nigerian Society for Education Through Art (NSEA) Lagos.
1975 Member, International Society of Education Through Art (INSEA), Hereford, England.
1974 International Directory of Arts, 12th edition, Verlag Muller GMBH and Company K.G. Frankfurt/Main, Germany.
1974 American Council on Education Lecture Tour to 8 American Universities in the USA.
1971 Member review panel W.A.E.C. Art Syllabus.
1971 Iskusstuo Stran I Narodov Mira Vol.3 Soviet Arts Encyclopedia, Moscow, USSR.
1971–78 Member of Advisory Committee, Institute of African Studies, University of Nigeria, Nsukka.
1971–76 Member of East Central State Arts Council and Chief Art Organiser for the State Festival of Arts.
1970 Member of International Bibliophile Association, Paris, France.

Papers and publications
2010	Nigeria @ 50, a publication by the Federal Government of Nigeria in commemoration of the 50th Anniversary of Nigeria's independence.
2003	NKU DI NA MBA: Uche Okeke and Modern Nigerian Art, National Gallery of Art, Lagos.
	The Triumph of a Vision: an Anthology on Uche Okeke and Modern Art in Nigeria, Pendulum Art Gallery.
2001	Historical Sketch of the Growth of the Catholic Church in Nimo, publication for 50th Anniversary of Our Lady of Assumption Parish in Nimo, Anambra State.
1998	The Zaria Art Society: A New Consciousness, National Gallery of Art, Lagos.
1995	Seven Stories about Modern Art in Africa, Whitechapel Art Gallery, London
1991	Terms of Art: Contemporary Nigerian Art in the International Context, Ministry of Culture, Nordrhine-Westfalen/Kunstsammilung Nordrhine-Westfalen, Düsseldorf, Germany.
1990	Eze Institution in Igboland, by Hanny Hahn-Waanders, Asele Institute Documentation Centre, Nimo, Anambra State.
1982	Art in Development: A Nigerian Perspective, Asele Institute Documentation Centre and the African American Cultural Center, Minneapolis, US.
1976	"Search for the Theoretical Basis of Contemporary Art", paper presented at the International Symposium on Contemporary Art, University of Nigeria, Nsukka.
	Modern Nigerian Art, Documentation Centre, Asele Institute, Nimo.
	Igbo Art, Asele Institute, Nimo.
1971	Tales of Land of Death: Igbo folktales by Uche Okeke, Doubleday, Zenith Books.
1969	Geschichte der Ibo Kunst, Dortmund Lecture No. 97, Dortmund: Kulturamt der Stadt Dortmund.
1961	Drawings by Uche Okeke, intro. Ulli Beier, Ibadan. Mbari Productions.

Public and private collections
National Museum of African Art, Smithsonian Institution.
National Gallery of Art, Abuja, Nigeria.
Baltimore Museum of Art, Maryland, USA.
Museum of Modern Art, New York, USA.
Newark Museum, Newark, New Jersey, USA.
Iwalewa Haus, Bayreuth, Germany.
Staatliche Graphische Sammlung, Munich Germany.
Franz Mayer Hofkunstanstalt, Munich, Germany.
Tate Modern Gallery, Liverpool, United Kingdom
OYASAF Foundation, Lagos, Nigeria.
Yemisi Shyllon Museum of Art, Lagos, Nigeria
Broadcast House Radio Nigeria, Kaduna, Nigeria.
Institute of African Studies, University of Nigeria, Nsukka.
University of Lagos, Nigeria.
Holy Trinity Cathedral, Nigeria.
National Council for Arts and Culture, Lagos, Nigeria.
Murtala Mohammed international Airport Lagos.
Akademie der Kunst, Berlin, Germany.
State House, Enugu, Nigeria.
Department of Fine and Applied Arts, University of Nigeria, Nsukka.
Dolly Fitterman Art Gallery Inc, Minneapolis, USA.
Beke Memorial Hospital, Nimo, Nigeria.
Ministry of Education and Information, Cultural Division, Enugu, Nigeria.
Mr and Mrs Chellarams.
Dr Ronald Severino, USA.
A. R. Jellings, United Kingdom.
W. J. Plume, United Kingdom.
Lady Dorothy Head, United Kingdom.
Frau Gertrude Buchta, Deisenhofen near Munich, Germany.
Demas Nwoko, Nigeria.
Mr and Mrs Alec Armstrong, United Kingdom.
Professor and Mrs Chinua Achebe.

References

Bio at the National Museum of African Art

1933 births
2016 deaths
Igbo painters
Academic staff of the University of Nigeria
Nigerian illustrators
20th-century Nigerian painters
21st-century Nigerian painters
Ahmadu Bello University alumni
Artists from Anambra State
Academic staff of the University of Port Harcourt